Neosilurus mollespiculum, commonly known as softspine catfish, is a species of catfish native to the Burdekin River system in Australia.

References

Freshwater fish of Australia
Venomous fish
Fish described in 1998
mollespiculum